The Liga Primer Indonesia Pre-season Tournament (Indonesian: Turnamen Pra-musim Liga Primer Indonesia) is a national football tournament held by the PT Liga Primer Indonesia, as pre-season tournament before Liga Primer Indonesia season. The tournament was held in 29 November - 11 December 2010. Bogor, the home city of Bogor Raya; Solo, the home base of Solo; and Semarang, the home base of Semarang United hosted the event.

At the beginning of this tournament will be followed by foreign teams. But it was nevertheless done because of the limited time to bring foreign teams so that the tournament is only followed by a local Liga Primer Indonesia participating clubs.

Format
The competition was followed by 13 Liga Primer Indonesia participating clubs which were divided into 3 groups each consisting of two groups of four clubs and a group of five clubs. Each club only competed twice in the tournament.

Participating clubs
13 clubs took part in this tournament.

Group A
Bogor Raya (host)
Batavia Union 
Jakarta 1928 
Manado United

Group B
Solo (host)
Tangerang United 
Real Mataram 
Medan Chiefs
Persema

Group C
Semarang United (host)
Persebaya 1927
Bali Devata
Bandung

Table & results

Group A
 All matches to be played in Persikabo Stadium, Bogor.
 All times are Western Indonesian Time (WIB) – UTC+7.

Group B
 All matches to be played in Manahan Stadium, Solo.
 All times are Western Indonesian Time (WIB) – UTC+7.

Group C
 All matches to be played in Jatidiri Stadium, Semarang.
 All times are Western Indonesian Time (WIB) – UTC+7.

References

External links
 Official Site

Pre-season Tournament